The Type 16 frigates were a class of British anti-submarine frigates of the Royal Navy. They were based on the hulls of World War II-era destroyers that had been rendered obsolete by rapid advances in technology. They were similar in concept to the Type 15 frigate, but were a far more limited design rendered necessary by budget constraints.

History
At the start of the Cold War, the Royal Navy was in urgent need of fast escort ships to counter the large number of s being built by the Soviet Union, which were faster than the Royal Navy's existing sloops and frigates. Britain had large numbers of War Emergency Programme destroyers, which while relatively new, were poorly equipped for modern fleet purposes, with poor anti-aircraft armament and fire control. It was therefore decided to convert the Emergency Programme destroyers to interim escorts to meet the Royal Navy's requirements until new-build ships (which eventually became the Type 12 and Type 14 frigates) could be designed and built. The initial design was the Type 15 frigate or Rapid class, which was a major rebuild of the ships, with an extended forecastle and new superstructure giving improved accommodation and complete replacement of the ships' armament and sensors. At one time, it was planned to convert 57 destroyers to the Type 15 standard, but the cost of such a large programme proved prohibitive, with only 23 ships becoming Type 15 frigates. Instead, a simpler and cheaper conversion, the Type 16 was ordered.

The Type 16 conversion removed the existing gun armament, substituting a twin 4 inch gun forward with a close-in anti-aircraft armament of seven Bofors 40 mm guns, with simpler fire control than used in the Type 15. Anti-submarine armament consisted of two Squid anti-submarine mortars, while a quadruple set of 21-inch (533 mm) torpedo tubes provided a limited anti-surface ship armament.

Ships

Ex-O class destroyers of the Pakistan Navy Onslow / Tippu Sultan and Onslaught / Tughril were returned to the UK between 1957 and 1959 to be converted along the lines of the Type 16 frigate.

See also
 War Emergency Programme destroyers: The destroyer building programme that the Type 16 frigates were converted from
 Type 15 frigate a more extensive conversion of destroyer hulls than the Type 16

References

Publications
 
 Friedman, Norman. British Destroyers & Frigates: The Second World War and After. London: Chatham Publishing, 2006. .
 Gardiner, Robert and Stephen Chumbley. Conway's All The World's Fighting Ships 1947–1995. Annapolis, Maryland, USA: Naval Institute Press, 1995. .
 Marriott, Leo. Royal Navy Frigates 1945-1983 Ian Allan, 1983, 

Frigate classes
Ship classes of the Royal Navy